
Year 481 (CDLXXXI) was a common year starting on Thursday (link will display the full calendar) of the Julian calendar. At the time, it was known as the Year of the Consulship of Maecius without colleague (or, less frequently, year 1234 Ab urbe condita). The denomination 481 for this year has been used since the early medieval period, when the Anno Domini calendar era became the prevalent method in Europe for naming years.

Events 
 By place 
 Europe 
 King Childeric I dies at Tournai after a 24-year reign. He is succeeded by his 15-year-old son Clovis, who becomes ruler of the Salian Franks in the province Gallia Belgica (modern Belgium) until his death in 511.
 Theodoric Strabo defeats the Bulgars in Thrace, and moves with an army (13,000 men) towards Constantinople. After logistical problems, he is forced to return to Greece. In an encampment at Stabulum Diomedis, near Philippi, he falls from an unruly horse onto a spear and dies.

 Persia 
 The Armenians revolt against Persian rule, in an uprising that continues until 484. Led by Vahan Mamikonian, nephew of the late Vartan, they obtain religious and political freedom in return for military aid. Vahan is installed as governor (marzban).

 Asia 
 Baekje, Silla, and Daegaya form an alliance against Goguryeo (Korea).

Births

Deaths 
 Childeric I, king of the Salian Franks (or 482)
 Sabinianus Magnus, Roman general
 Theodoric Strabo, Ostrogothic chieftain
 Timothy III, patriarch of Alexandria

References